Pinellas Park High School is a public secondary school in Largo, Florida, United States. It opened in the fall of 1976 and is part of the Pinellas County Schools system. The school mascot is the Patriot, and the school colors are red, white and blue. The school newspaper is called the Powder Horn Press and the yearbook is Occurrences. The school is home to the Criminal Justice Academy magnet program, as well as the First Responders magnet program.

History 
Pinellas Park High School, located in Largo, Florida, opened its doors in August 1976. Because of the United States Bicentennial occurring that year, it adopted the name "The Patriots" and chose red, white, and blue as its school colors. In 2001, the school received a $500,000 grant to develop smaller learning communities. Five SLCs comprising the entire school population exist today: Freshman Forum (for incoming freshmen); Arts & Humanities; Environmental, Medical and Biological Alliance; Sophomore Seminar, and Business Design Technologies. The ESOL program helps foreign-language speakers and GOALS acts as a drop-out prevention program. As a result of the Pinellas county introduction of Choice schools, 80% of the school's students come from throughout the county.

Student demographics 
The total student population of approximately 2,300 students comprises 70.3% Caucasians, 12.7% African-Americans, 9.5% Hispanics, 5.9% Asians, 0.2% American Indian, and 1.4% Other. The student attendance rate is 92.7%. Pinellas Park High School is one of the most ethnically diverse schools of the country, comprising a large number of students from Latin and Asian countries. ESOL students form 6% of the total school population, and special education students make up 17% of the student body. PPHS is one of the district centers for special education students.

Programs

Criminal Justice Academy
The Criminal Justice Academy is a four-year magnet program at Pinellas Park High School that teaches students about the American legal system and the careers found in that system. Students must apply for the Criminal Justice Academy. Eighth grade applicants must have stanines of 5 or higher on standardized tests, GPA of 2.5 or higher for all work in sixth and seventh grades, 2 positive academic teacher recommendations, and good discipline and attendance records. Mainstream sophomores may join if they didn't have the opportunity the year before.

First Responders 
The school's First Responders program was founded in 2009. The program teaches students emergency planning and response along with first aid, CPR, and gives students chances for certifications with FEMA and the basic HAZMAT training. The senior classes have a chance to take a college EMR class and participate in Pinellas Park High's "Disaster Day," where the underclassmen act as if a natural disaster has occurred and depend on the seniors to assist, take control of, and isolate the situation. The students who join the First Responder program are required to volunteer with the community to illustrate the program's involvement and dedication to the community

Building 
The building includes a gymnasium and auditorium, a media center and library, several computer labs, a well-furnished weight room, a complete autobody shop, and a complete printing shop.

The CJA building was built between 1996 and 1998 and opened to students in the fall of 1998. The building has  of space, including several classrooms, administration offices, a mock courtroom, and an apartment used as a mock crime scene.

Notable incidents

School shooting 
The school made news on February 11, 1988, when two 15-year-old male students, Jason Harless and Jason McCoy, brought guns which they stole from a sheriff's home to the school cafeteria, where they showed the guns off to friends. Other students reported this to the school administrators. One assistant principal asked for the guns to be turned in, but Harless aimed the gun at the assistant principal.  Richard Allen, another Assistant Principal, approached Harless from behind and attempted to dislodge the gun from Harless' hand. Harless reached back and shot Allen in the temple, point blank. This situation escalated and resulted in the shooting of Assistant Principal Nancy Blackwelder, and intern Joseph Bloznalis. Blackwelder was shot by a bullet that traveled through her body from hip to shoulder. Bloznalis received a shattering shot to the knee.  Allen was killed. Blackwelder and Bloznalis, an assistant physical education teacher who was interning from the University of South Florida, were injured. Harless was taken down by a bullet that grazed his shoulder during a shootout with the police outside the front entrance as he attempted to flee. McCoy was captured later at a residence.

Harless was sentenced to 17 years in adult prison and was later released after eight years imprisonment after serving his sentence in the Sumter Correctional Institution. McCoy was sentenced to six years in adult prison, but served 14 months in a “youthful offenders” facility. Neither has been known to attend any of the annual homecoming events at the school each fall. As of 2012, records indicate that McCoy was living in Tennessee, and Harless in an interview said he was living in Holiday, Florida.

Notable alumni 
 Browning Nagle - Former New York Jets quarterback 
 Pamela Stein - Playboy Playmate
 Fez Whatley - Radio Personality from the Ron & Fez show on terrestrial radio and Sirius XM.

References

External links 
 
 Pinellas County Schools Home Page
 Pinellas Park High School Criminal Justice Academy

High schools in Pinellas County, Florida
Buildings and structures in Largo, Florida
Magnet schools in Florida
Public high schools in Florida
Educational institutions established in 1976
1976 establishments in Florida